Somonauk is a village in DeKalb and LaSalle Counties in the U.S. state of Illinois. The population was 1,786 at the 2020 Census, down from 1,893 at the 2010 Census.

The DeKalb County portion of Somonauk is part of the Chicago-Naperville-Elgin, IL-IN-WI Metropolitan Statistical Area, while the small portion that lies in LaSalle County is part of the Ottawa, IL Micropolitan Statistical Area.

Early history 
The name "Somonauk" is of Pottawatomie origin. The name is most likely derived from the phonetic phrase As-sim-in-eh-kon, which translates to "pawpaw grove", in reference to the vast groves of pawpaw trees that filled the area at that time.

The Second Treaty of Prairie du Chien, signed by General John McNeil Jr., Colonel Pierre Menard, and Caleb Atwater for the United States on June 29, 1829, references four sections of land being reserved for Chief Awn-kote and his band of 171 villagers "at the village of Saw-meh-naug along the Fox and Illinois Rivers". The Saw-meh-naug, along with the other Pottawatomie of the Illinois River (known as the Prairie Group), as well as the Sauk and the Chippewa, had aided the U.S. in the Black Hawk War. After the war, as a thanks to the Pottawatomie, the U.S. Government signed a treaty allowing the Prairie Group tribes to continue to hunt on U.S. land, outside of their allocated reservations. However, due to "rumors of the Pottawatomie being restless and committing depredations in the northern part of the state spreading to central Illinois", and white residents of the state feeling uncomfortable, the Governor "gave the Prairie Group an ultimatum to leave Illinois". By the end of December 1833, the Pottawatomie had left Illinois, and the settlements of the Pottawatomie were free to be claimed by white settlers.

A few months later, in the spring of 1834, the first white settler in DeKalb County had set up shop along a tributary to the Fox River, and the name Somonauk was moved from the area of present-day Ottawa, to where Chicago Road, Governor Beveridge Highway, and Somonauk Creek meet. This is the area known as present-day "Franks". The simple log cabin was used as a station house along the Chicago-Galena mail route between Aurora and Genoa, and would eventually become property of the Beveridge family. This cabin was the first post office in Somonauk Township, and the area both east and west of Somonauk Creek would eventually have 30 settlers, establishing a Presbyterian Church in the same area as the present-day church, and a school house directly across from it on the west side of Governor Beveridge Highway. It's also widely known that this church was a stop on the underground railroad.

Later, in 1836, the post office for the settlement of Somonauk was moved to the intersection of Chicago Road and Somonauk Road and the name would be changed to "Somonauk Crossing". Another post office was established in 1850 on Somonauk Road at present-day Buck Lake, and was known as "Buck's Branch". In 1851, the CB&Q railroad finally made its way through the township, and in 1853, built a station along the line 5 miles south of the early settlement (now known as "Franks"), just north of the LaSalle/DeKalb County border. With that, the name "Somonauk" would make one final move to its current location, being in platted in 1855, and incorporated in 1865. "Somonauk Crossing" then became known as "Freeland Corners". The name of Buck's Branch would change to "Somonoc Depot" for a brief time before the post office was moved to the actual Somonauk railroad depot in December 1855. The closing of "Freeland Corners" post office was such a hardship to the farmers of Freeland Corners and Somonauk Crossing, that they petitioned the Post Office Department to establish another office in the location of Frank Richey's creamers, and that it be called Frank's Post Office. A post office was established in November 1891, once again located in the area of Chicago Road and Somonauk Creek, this time, on the west side of Rimsnider Road, just north of the creek. The post office was discontinued in April 1902, lasting a mere 11 years.

Geography
Somonauk is located at  (41.6327194, -88.6865175). The village is situated along the boundary between DeKalb and LaSalle counties. In the 2000 census, 1,190 of Somonauk's 1,295 residents (91.9%) lived in DeKalb County and 105 (8.1%) lived in LaSalle County.

Sannauk Forest Preserve serves as the unofficial boundary between Somonauk and Sandwich, which resides to the east.  The forest preserve, owned and managed by DeKalb County, sits along Somonauk Creek, a tributary of the Fox River.

During the housing bubble of the mid-2000s,  a few new subdivisions were planned to be built north of town.  When the housing market crashed, the city had already incorporated a large portion of DeKalb county north of town ranging from the Sandwich Township border to Governor Beverage Highway, remaining south of Pratt Road.  Since then, no talk has indicated that the subdivisions will be built.

The nearby Lake Holiday area includes a man-made lake created by the damming of Somonauk Creek. An old gravel pit was also flooded and is part of the lake.

Demographics

As of the 2020 census there were 1,786 people, 721 households, and 518 families residing in the village. The racial makeup of the village was 90.71% White, 0.34% African American, 0.17% Native American, 0.17% Asian, 2.13% from other races, and 6.49% from two or more races. Hispanic or Latino of any race were 6.55% of the population.

There were 721 households, out of which 62.14% had children under the age of 18 living with them, 59.50% were married couples living together, 10.96% had a female householder with no husband present, and 28.16% were non-families. 24.55% of all households were made up of individuals, and 10.96% had someone living alone who was 65 years of age or older. The average household size was 3.29 and the average family size was 2.81.

The village's age distribution consisted of 25.6% under the age of 18, 9.3% from 18 to 24, 23.3% from 25 to 44, 24.2% from 45 to 64, and 17.5% who were 65 years of age or older. The median age was 37.8 years. For every 100 females, there were 85.3 males. For every 100 females age 18 and over, there were 79.9 males.

The median income for a household in the village was $71,375, and the median income for a family was $87,667. Males had a median income of $50,000 versus $27,639 for females. The per capita income for the village was $32,921. About 3.7% of families and 7.7% of the population were below the poverty line, including 8.8% of those under age 18 and 5.9% of those age 65 or over.

Education
The village of Somonauk is served by Somonauk Community Unit School District (CUSD) #432 which offers grades Pre-K–12. The school's athletic teams are known as the Bobcats. School colors are blue and gold. The school's song is titled "Bobcat Loyalty", and is a basic spin-off of the University of Illinois' fight song, named "Illinois Loyalty".

The community adjoins a private community known as "Lake Holiday". Somonauk School District covers most of the west side of the lake as well as a section of the southeast side. Sandwich Community Unit School District 430 covers most of the east side and a two small sections on the west side of the lake.

References

External links

Somonauk Public Library

1865 establishments in Illinois
Populated places established in 1865
Ottawa, IL Micropolitan Statistical Area
Villages in DeKalb County, Illinois
Villages in Illinois
Villages in LaSalle County, Illinois